is a Japanese footballer who plays as a defender for J2 League club Ventforet Kofu, on loan from Kawasaki Frontale. He is the twin brother of fellow professional footballer Ryoto Kamiya.

Career
On 12 January 2022, Kaito Kamiya loaned to Fujieda MYFC for 2022 season.

On 13 December at same year, Kaito Kamiya loaned again to Ventforet Kofu for upcoming 2023 season.

Career statistics

Club
.

Notes

Honours

Kawasaki Frontale
J1 League: 2020, 2021
Emperor's Cup: 2020
Japanese Super Cup: 2021

References

External links

1997 births
Living people
Association football people from Aichi Prefecture
Tokai Gakuen University alumni
Japanese footballers
Association football defenders
J1 League players
Kawasaki Frontale players
J3 League players
Fujieda MYFC players
Ventforet Kofu players